Girolamo di Bernardino or Girolamo da Bernardino (active around 1506) was an Italian painter of the Renaissance period. A painter of the Venetian school and a pupil of Pellegrino da San Daniele, he is known primarily for a small picture of The Coronation of the Virgin, painted for San Francesco in Udine.

He decorated the churches at Lestizza and Carmona (now in Slovenia) with frescoes in 1511 and 1518.

References

15th-century births
16th-century deaths
People from Friuli
15th-century Italian painters
Italian male painters
16th-century Italian painters
Renaissance painters
Year of death unknown
Year of birth unknown